Floyd Lee Collier (May 10, 1924 – September 3, 2002) was an American football player who played at the tackle position. He played college football for San Jose State and USC, military football for the 1944 Saint Mary's Pre-Flight Air Devils football team, and professional football for the 1948 San Francisco 49ers.

Early years
Collier was born in 1924 in Fresno, California. He attended and played football at Exeter Union High School in Exeter, California.

Military and college football
After graduating from high school, Collier enrolled at San Jose State College in 1942. He was a member of the 1942 San Jose State Spartans football team and also competed in the discus and javelin throw for the San Jose State track team.

His college career was interrupted by service in the United States Navy during World War II. While serving in the Navy, he played as a first string tackle for the 1944 Saint Mary's Pre-Flight Air Devils football team that was ranked No. 19 in the final AP Poll.

After the war, Collier enrolled at the University of Southern California and played on the 1946 USC Trojans football team.

Professional football
Collier played professional football in the All-America Football Conference for the 1948 San Francisco 49ers team that compiled a 12–2 record and averaged over 35 points per game. During the 49ers preseason training camp, Collier entertained the team by hypnotizing teammates Verl Lillywhite and Paul Crowe into taking off their shoes and scratching their left feet. He appeared in 12 of the 49ers' 14 games.

Family and later years
Collier died in 2002 at age 78 in Laguna Hills, California.

References

1924 births
2002 deaths
San Francisco 49ers (AAFC) players
USC Trojans football players
San Jose State Spartans football players
Players of American football from California
Sportspeople from Fresno, California
American football tackles
United States Navy personnel of World War II
San Francisco 49ers players